New Radiant Sports Club is a Maldivian professional football club based in Henveiru – Malé, Maldives. The club was founded on 19 August 1979 by Ahmed Waheed and his friend Ahammadhanik. New Radiant has won all domestic competitions being held in the Maldives and the club is the most successful in the Maldives in terms of trophies won and is also the most successful Maldivian club in the international arena. They were semi-finalists in the AFC Cup in 2005 and the only Maldivian club to have progressed beyond group stages in the AFC cup in multiple occasions.

New Radiant has won Dhivehi League/Dhivehi Premier League six times, FA cup 12 times out of 29 and have won the Maldives Cup Winners' Cup four times. They won President's Cup 12 times and POMIS Cup 3 times. In 2019 Football Association of Maldives suspended New Radiant from all football related activities due to unpaid wages to the players and failing to pay fines amounting to almost USD 2 Million to FIFA and FAM.

History

1994–1999
In 94' Season, New Radiant won POMIS Cup and FA cup. In 95' Season, the blues won POMIS Cup and Maldives National Championship / President's Cup. New Radiant won all the competitions that were held in 1997. In 98' Season, the blues won FA Cup three times in a row and became first team to do so in Maldivian footballing history. In 1999, New Radiant won only Maldives Cup Winners' Cup.

2000–2003
In the year 2000, New Radiant won only Maldives Cup Winners' Cup.

2004–2008
In 04' Season, New Radiant claimed the FA cup and became the first team ever to qualify for the Asian cup.

In 2005 Season, The blues reached the Semi-finals of the AFC Cup 2005 and were beaten in semi-finals by champions Al Faisaly of Jordan.

In 2006, was a successful season for New Radiant. The blues won FA cup and the Dhivehi League.

In 07' Season, The Blues were able to clinch 2 titles, both the FA cup and the President's Cup. Dhivehi League was dominated by New Radiantt during the early stages, but after poor results against smaller clubs like Maziya and Vyansa, Victory took the lead. The winner was decided on the last match which the Blues lost against the Red Devils.

In 2008, The first tournament of the season, the Cup Winners Cup was won by New Radiant. They lost FA cup final against VB Sports Club. After dominated in the first games of season, but the Blues ended up with poor results in the League & Presidents' Cup. They were knocked out of the AFC Cup 2008 in the group stage with 1 win, 1 draw and 4 losses.

2009–2011
In 2009 Season, this was the year club did not win any of the tournaments after 2002. The Blues did not qualify for the AFC Cup 2009. The year 2010 was also an unsuccessful year for New Radiant. But the club ended the unbeaten streak of League Champions VB Sports Club in the FA cup semi-final. However, similar to the previous years, they had to end the season with no success, as they lost the FA cup final against Victory. In 2011, the Club reached President's Cup final but lost against the Victory Sports club.

2012–2015
They won 2012 Dhivehi League without losing a single match and also won the President's Cup by beating Victory Sports Club in the final. During the whole season, New Radiant lost just one match, which was against Club Eagles in the quarter-final of FA cup. They qualified for the AFC Cup 2013 and have brought the most promising young stars to the team in preparation for the continental stage.

In 2013, the blues won the first Charity Shield match from the beginning of the season and they won 2013 Dhivehi League shield, becoming the first team in the history to finish off the league with a 100 percent record, without losing or drawing any of their matches. In August 2013, they won the Veterans Cup (35+ age) for the first time. At the beginning of October, they won FA Cup after 5 years. New Radiant SC finished the season by winning the President's Cup and that completed the domestic season with a remarkable 100% winning record.
This year the blues reached AFC Cup 2013 quarter final to make another records.

In 2014 Season, On June 10, the blues won the Maldives FA Charity Shield match by beating Maziya. The club won 2014 Dhivehi League three times in a row and qualify AFC Cup 2015. On November 30, New Radiant SC won 2014 President's Cup three times in a row and that completed the record for the Maldivian football history to the only club which won all top division championship three times in a row.
In this year, the Blues also won the 2014 FAM Women's Football Championship after beating Maldives National Defence Force (MNDF).

In 2015, the Blues reached President's Cup final but lost against Maziya. The club won 2015 Dhivehi Premier League four times in a row and qualify AFC Cup 2016 group stage.

2016

In 2016, New Radiant SC finished fifth position in 2016 Dhivehi Premier League and knockout in the group stage of AFC Cup 2016. The Blues finished 3rd in FA cup and knockout in the group stage of President's Cup.
After 2011, this was the year club did not win any of the tournaments.

2017–2018
The Blues finished 3rd in Male' League and promoted to 2017 Dhivehi Premier League. In this year New Radiant SC won 2017 Dhivehi Premier League and qualify AFC Cup 2018 group stage. Also won FA cup & President's Cup by beating TC Sports Club.

In 2018, New Radiant SC finished second of AFC Cup 2018 Group F. This year the blues won Male' League after 2004.

Honours

Domestic
Dhivehi League/Dhivehi Premier League
 Champions (6): 2006, 2012, 2013, 2014, 2015, 2017

Maldives FA Cup
Winners (12): 1989, 1991, 1994, 1996, 1997, 1998, 2001, 2005, 2006, 2007, 2013, 2017

Maldives National Championship / President's Cup
Winners (12): 1982, 1987, 1990, 1991, 1995, 1997, 2004, 2007, 2012, 2013, 2014, 2017

Maldivian FA Charity Shield
Winners: 2013, 2014

Maldives Cup Winners' Cup
Winners: 1999, 2000, 2003, 2008

Male' League
Winners: 2004, 2018

POMIS Cup
Winners: 1994, 1995, 1997

Other
Veterans Cup
Winners: 2013, 2015, 2016, 2017

FAM Women's Football Championship
Winners: 2014, 2015

Best moments

 1987 – Represented Maldives in the Football event of South Asian Games
 1995 – Played in Asian Cup Winners Cup
 1996 – Played in Asian Cup Winners Cup
 1997 – Won all the tournaments of the season (POMIS Cup, FA cup and Maldives National Championship / President's Cup)
 1998 – Won FA cup thrice in three years
 2005 – Reached Semi-finals of AFC Cup 2005
 2006 – Won Dhivehi League for the first time
 2007 – Won FA cup again for thrice in three years.
 2008 – Won Cup winners cup by beating Victory Sports Club in final. This was the last Cup winners cup tournament.
 2012 – Won Dhivehi League without losing a single game and President's Cup. In every games of the season, not conceded two goals in a single match, which was a local record.
 2013 – Won all the domestic tournaments (Maldivian FA Charity Shield, 2013 Dhivehi League, FA cup, President's Cup) and finished the domestic season with a 100% winning record. Finished top of the group AFC Cup 2013 with a top scoring team in first round & reached Quarter finals of AFC Cup 2013.
 2014 – The club won 2014 Dhivehi League & President's Cup three times in a row . This was the record for the Maldivian football history to the only club which won all top division championship three times in a row.
 2015 – The club won 2015 Dhivehi Premier League four times in a row .
 2017 – The club won 2017 Dhivehi Premier League, FA cup & President's Cup.

Season by season records (1979–1999)
Updated on 30 November 2015

 National Championship = President's Cup (Maldives)
 Cup Winners' Cup = Maldives Cup Winners' Cup
 –  = Not yet Introduced or Not held

Season by season records (2000–2018)
Updated on 03 June 2018

 Pld = Played
 GW = Games won
 D = Games drawn
 L = Games lost
 GF = Goals for
 GA = Goals against
 Pts = Points
 Pos = Final position

 DL = Dhivehi League
 DPL = Dhivehi Premier League
 CW Cup = Maldives Cup Winners' Cup

 NQ = Not Qualified
 n/a = No Allocation slots in Maldives
 –  = Not held or Abolished
 QR2 = Second Qualifying Round
 R1 = Round 1
 GS = Group stage
 QF = Quarter-finals

Continental record

1 New Radiant apparently qualified for quarter-final; reason unknown
2 New Radiant withdrew
3 Ratnam withdrew after 1st leg
4 The 2nd leg was cancelled due to political violence in Sri Lanka.

Current squad

Board of Directors

 Chairman:  (Colonel Retired) Mohamed Ziyad 
 Vice chairman:  Sayyid Ali
 Vice chairman   Ismail Ziyam
 Board Director:  Ahmed Shiyam
 Board Director:  Abdul Muiz Musthafa
 Board Director:  Hassan Hussain
 Board Director:  Hussain Shaam Adam
 Board Director:   Ismail Rasheed
 Board Director:  Nalin Chaminda Udhage Kankanange

Senior Management

 general secretary:  Ahmed Niyaz Moosa

Club Officials

 Manager:  Ahmed Rasheed
 Head coach: 
 Assistant coach:  Ashraf Luthfee
 Assistant coach & Goalkeeper Coach:  Hassan Hameed
 Assistant coach:  Adam Abdul Latheef (Lahchey)
 Assistant coach:  Adam Fazeeh
 Kit Manager: Mohamed Rasheed
 Official:  Ahmed Fayaz
 Official:  Mohamed Fazeel

External links

New Radiant on maldivesoccer.com (archived 10 March 2007)
New Radiant on the-AFC.com
New Radiant Sports Club Badge

Footnotes

 
Football clubs in the Maldives
Football clubs in Malé
Association football clubs established in 1979
1979 establishments in the Maldives
Dhivehi Premier League clubs